Bohdan Deneha (born 10 June 1996) is a professional Ukrainian football striker.

Club career

Youth years
Deneha is the product of the FC Nika Ivano-Frankivsk and YFS Dynamo Kyiv of Valeriy Lobanovsky School Systems. From 2013 until 2014 Deneha played for FC Kalush at the Amateur level.

FC Veres Rivne
He made his professional debut for FC Veres Rivne in a game against FC Arsenal Kyiv on 5 September 2015 in Ukrainian Second League.

FC Karpaty Lviv
In February 2016, Deneha joined FC Karpaty Lviv.

FC Teplovyk Ivano-Frankivsk
In July 2016, Bohdan joined FC Teplovyk Ivano-Frankivsk.

Career statistics

References

External links
Statistics at FFU website 
Statistics at Ukrainian Premier League website

1996 births
Living people
Ukrainian footballers
NK Veres Rivne players
FC Prykarpattia Ivano-Frankivsk (1998) players
FC Kalush players
Association football forwards